Xu Zhihong (born  1942) is a Chinese botanist and former President of Peking University. He is a former vice-president of the Chinese Academy of Sciences. In 2009, Zhihong was conferred upon the award of Hilal-i-Quaid-i-Azam in recognition of his services to Pakistan. Asteroid 90826 Xuzhihong, discovered by the Beijing Schmidt CCD Asteroid Program in 1995, was named in his honor. The official  was published by the Minor Planet Center on 4 October 2009.

References

External links 
 Biography of Xu Zhihong

1942 births
Living people
Academics of the University of Nottingham
Biologists from Jiangsu
20th-century Chinese botanists
Educators from Wuxi
Members of the Chinese Academy of Sciences
Academic staff of Peking University
Presidents of Peking University
Scientists from Wuxi